Justice Brooke may refer to:

Flavius L. Brooke, associate justice of the Michigan Supreme Court
Francis T. Brooke, associate justice of the Virginia Supreme Court